B.B. Whitehouse, later known as Whitehouse Brothers, were organ builders based in Brisbane, Queensland, Australia.

History 
The firm was founded in the early 1900s by Benjamin Burton Whitehouse junior and Joseph Howell Whitehouse.

Commissioned organs 

St. Marks Church, Warwick, 1923 (pencil drawing of organ amongst plans owned by Conrad Dornbusch (architect in Warwick) who designed the organ loft for that church in 1923 (Dornbusch collection, held by R. Wood, Sydney, 2020).
Holy Trinity Anglican Church, Woolloongabba (1930)
First Church of Christ, Scientist, Brisbane (1940)
St Ignatius Loyola Church, Toowong (1959)
Wynnum Baptist Church (1952), relocated in 1993 to St Paul's Anglican Church, East Brisbane
Christ Church, Milton (prior to 1984)
Corpus Christi Church, Nundah

References 

Musical instrument manufacturing companies of Australia
Organ builders
Manufacturing companies based in Brisbane
1900s establishments in Australia
Pipe organ building companies
Family-owned companies of Australia